This is a list of award winners and league leaders for the Tampa Bay Rays professional baseball team.

Regular season award winners

Cy Young Award

 David Price (2012)
 Blake Snell (2018)

Rookie of the Year

 Evan Longoria (2008)
 Jeremy Hellickson (2011)
 Wil Myers (2013)
 Randy Arozarena (2021)

Gold Glove Award

 Carlos Peña, 1B (2008)
 Evan Longoria, 3B (2009, 2010, 2017)
 Carl Crawford, LF (2010)
 Jeremy Hellickson, P (2012)
 Kevin Kiermaier, CF (2015  [Platinum Glove] , 2016, 2019)

Wilson Defensive Player of the Year Award

See explanatory note at Atlanta Braves award winners and league leaders.
Team (at all positions)
 (2012)
 (2013)

Silver Slugger Award

 Carlos Peña, 1B (2007)
 Evan Longoria, 3B (2009)
 Carl Crawford, OF (2010)

Comeback Player of the Year

 Carlos Peña (2007)
 Fernando Rodney (2012)

Manager of the Year

See footnote
 Joe Maddon (2008, 2011)
 Kevin Cash (2020, 2021)

Roberto Clemente Award

Nelson Cruz (2021)

MLB "This Year in Baseball Awards"

Note: These awards were renamed the "GIBBY Awards" (Greatness in Baseball Yearly) in 2010 and then the "Esurance MLB Awards" in 2015.

"Esurance MLB Awards" Best Defensive Player
Kevin Kiermaier (2015)

DHL Hometown Heroes (2006)

Wade Boggs — voted by MLB fans as the most outstanding player in the history of the franchise, based on on-field performance, leadership quality, and character value.

Baseball America Rookie of the Year

Jeremy Hellickson (2011)

Baseball America All-Rookie Team
See: Baseball America#Baseball America All-Rookie Team
2011 – Desmond Jennings (OF; one of three) and Jeremy Hellickson (SP; one of five)

Topps All-Star Rookie Rosters

Tony Conigliaro Award

Rocco Baldelli (2008)

Baseball America Manager of the Year
See: Baseball America#Baseball America Manager of the Year
See footnote
Joe Maddon (2011)

USA Today AL Top Manager
Joe Maddon (2011)

Baseball Prospectus AL Manager of the Year

Joe Maddon (2011)

Chuck Tanner Major League Baseball Manager of the Year Award

See footnote
Joe Maddon (2008)

Sporting News Manager of the Year Award

 Joe Maddon (2008, 2011)
 Kevin Cash (2019, 2020)

Postseason and All-Star Game MVP award winners

American League Championship Series MVP
See: League Championship Series Most Valuable Player Award#American League winners
Matt Garza (2008)
Randy Arozarena (2020)

All-Star Game MVP

Carl Crawford (2009)

Team awards
 ,  – William Harridge Trophy (American League champion)
 2008 – Baseball America Organization of the Year

Team records (single-game, single-season, career)

Minor-league system

Baseball America Minor League Player of the Year Award

Rocco Baldelli (2002)
Delmon Young (2005)
Jeremy Hellickson (2010)

TOPPS Minor League Player of the Year 
See footnote and Topps#Awards
Delmon Young (2005)
Matt Moore (2011)

USA Today Minor League Player of the Year Award

Josh Hamilton (2000)
David Price (2008)
Jeremy Hellickson (2010)

Joe Bauman Home Run Award

Kevin Witt, Durham Bulls (2006)

Other achievements

National Baseball Hall of Fame
See: Tampa Bay Rays#Baseball Hall of Famers

Retired numbers
See: Tampa Bay Rays#Retired numbers

See also
Ted Williams Museum and Hitters Hall of Fame (including Tampa Bay Rays exhibit)
Baseball awards
List of Major League Baseball awards

Footnotes

External links
Awards. Tampa Bay Rays official website
Single Game Records. Tampa Bay Rays official website

Awards
Major League Baseball team trophies and awards